The Waveney-class lifeboat was the first class of lifeboats operated by the Royal National Lifeboat Institution (RNLI) capable of operating at speeds in excess of .  Based on an American design, 22 saw operational service between 1964 and 1999 at the RNLI's stations around the coast of the United Kingdom and Ireland. After being superseded by faster boats in the 1990s, many were sold for further use with lifeboat services abroad, notably in Australia and New Zealand.

The class name comes from the River Waveney which discharges into the North Sea at Great Yarmouth.

History
In the 1960s the RNLI's fleet consisted of motor lifeboats of limited speed due to the shape of their hulls. The United States Coast Guard (USCG) had developed a 44-foot motor lifeboat which planed across the surface of the water, the consequence of which is a reduced wetted surface area to the hull, and therefore a much higher speed. One was built for the RNLI by the USCG in Curtis Bay Coast Guard Yard, Maryland, and this was put through extensive trials and proved capable of operating in restricted spaces, even though the propellers lacked the usual protection afforded to lifeboats.

The prototype was never given a name although the crews nicknamed it "The Yank". It entered trials in 1964 but the first production boats did not start to emerge until 1967. After six had been placed in service there was a hiatus which lasted until 1974 when production was restarted, and then continued through until 1982 by which time 22 were in service. The entire fleet was replaced between 1996 and 1999 as new Trent and Severn lifeboats came into service, but many were sold for further use as lifeboats or pilot boats.

The boats launched in 1967 and 1968 were built by Brooke Marine at Lowestoft and those in 1974/5 by Groves and Gutterdige in Cowes. The 1976/7 batch came from Bideford Ship Yard and the last three from Fairey Marine in Cowes.

Description

The hull is divided into seven watertight compartments including two survivor compartments and a crew space. The coxswain operates the boat from an open wheelhouse.

The prototype was built with twin  Cummins V-6 engines but in 1973 was upgraded to  Ford Mermaid 595T 6-cylinder engines. The first batch of production boats were initially built with pairs of  Cummins V-6 engines. All these, including the by then re-engined prototype were fitted in the early 1980s with  Caterpillar D3208 V-8 engines. The Groves & Guttridge built boats of 1974/5 had more powerful  General Motors V-8 engines which they retained throughout their service life. The four boats of the 1976/7 Bideford Ship Yard build were originally fitted with 250 bhp Ford Mermaid 595T 6-cylinder engines but these were changed within five years for 250 bhp Caterpillar D3208T V-8 engines as had by then been fitted to the three final boats.

RNLI fleet

Other fleets

Australia

New Zealand

Elsewhere

References

See also
 Histories of the Waveney-class

Royal National Lifeboat Institution lifeboats